Nukabad (also Romanized as Nūkābād; also known as Shamsābād-e Sarhang) is a village in Howmeh Rural District, in the Central District of Iranshahr County, Sistan and Baluchestan Province, Iran. At the 2016 census, its population was 4983, in 1085 families.

References 

Populated places in Iranshahr County